Deepa Sahi (born 30 November 1962) is an Indian actress and producer from an Army background, who is best known for her role as Maya in the 1993 movie Maya Memsaab, opposite actor Farooq Sheikh. She made her directorial debut with the movie Tere Mere Phere in 2011.

Early and personal life

Deepa Sahi, an ethnic Punjabi, was born in Dehradun in an Army background and is the youngest sibling in her family. She grew up in Meerut.
Her family later shifted to Canada, but she continued to stay in India. She had an elder sister who died at the age of 18. Sahi pursued her education at Indraprastha College for Women, and was a gold medalist in Sociology from Delhi School of Economics. Sahi later joined the NSD with the aim of becoming a director.
However, she started receiving acting offers from her NSD days, which prompted her to shift to acting. Sahi decided to direct her first film in the early days of her career but the film, Nana Karte Pyaar which was supposed to star Nana Patekar and Hema Malini failed to take off due to a recession.
She is married to film director Ketan Mehta, who is the nephew of freedom fighter Usha Mehta. It is the second marriage for both of them.

Early career
An alumnus of NSD, Delhi, Sahi started off with a theater career, with strong Leftist leanings and social activism a core value of the productions she was involved with.

In her early film career she collaborated with noted auteur Govind Nihalani and made her debut with the 1984 film Party.
This was well received, and she subsequently acted in Aghaat (1985). Her thespian achievement, however, will always remain her role as the independent-minded and empowered lower-caste Punjabi woman she played in the highly acclaimed television film Tamas (1986).

Commercial cinema
After marrying film director Ketan Mehta, she acted in several of his films including Hero Hiralal (1988), Maya Memsaab (1992) and Oh Darling! Yeh Hai India! (1995). She wrote the screenplay for Oh Darling! Yeh Hai India!. Maya Memsaab was controversial for featuring an explicit sex scene between Sahi and then upcoming actor Shah Rukh Khan. Her other notable films include Hum (1991), Trinetra (1991) and Ek Doctor Ki Maut (1991).

Her last film appearances was in her husband's film Aar Ya Paar (1998) She got a Filmfare best supporting actress nomination for Hum and National Award (Jury) for Maya Memsaab.

In 2015, she returned to acting after 18 years appearing in her husband's film Manjhi – The Mountain Man in a cameo role as Indira Gandhi.

Production career

She became a producer in 1993. She has produced seven films to date:

Besides this, she has produced 12 TV series and is promoter of Maya Entertainment Pvt. Ltd. one of India's leading animation studios. She was the CEO of Maya Entertainment from 2000 to 2002 and was responsible for the long-term strategy of the company; she made many entries into other animation avenues such as MAAC, etc.  After her stint as the CEO of Maya Entertainment, she returned to her first love cinema. She made her directorial debut with the 2011 film  Tere Mere Phere. Together with Ketan Mehta, she co-founded an animation company, Cosmos-Maya

Filmography

References

External links

20th-century Indian actresses
Living people
Punjabi people
Indraprastha College for Women alumni
National School of Drama alumni
Indian film actresses
Actresses in Hindi cinema
Indian women film producers
Film producers from Uttarakhand
1965 births
Indian women screenwriters
Indian women film directors
20th-century Indian film directors
21st-century Indian film directors
Hindi film producers
Hindi-language film directors
Film directors from Uttarakhand
Women artists from Uttarakhand
Artists from Uttarakhand
Actresses from Dehradun
Screenwriters from Uttarakhand
Writers from Dehradun
Women writers from Uttarakhand
21st-century Indian actresses
Businesspeople from Dehradun
Businesswomen from Uttar Pradesh
20th-century Indian businesswomen
20th-century Indian businesspeople
21st-century Indian businesswomen
21st-century Indian businesspeople